Abdolabad (also Romanized as ‘Abdolābād; also known as Abdollāhābād and ‘Abdollāhābād) is a village in Khatunabad Rural District, in the Central District of Shahr-e Babak County, Kerman Province, Iran. At the 2006 census, its population was 72, in 20 families.

References 

Populated places in Shahr-e Babak County